Arnold van Mill (March 26, 1921 in Schiedam – October 5, 1996 in Hamburg) was a Dutch opera singer who specialised in bass.

Debut
He made his debut in 1941 at the 'Circustheater' in The Hague as Wagner in the opera Faust of Charles Gounod. After the Second World War ended, he started to sing at the Flemish Opera. There, he already sang the great bass roles of the repertoire like Boris Godunov, King Marke, Hagen and Gurnemanz. Minor detail worth mentioning: he sang these roles in Dutch.

Bayreuther Festspiele
His career got a real boost when he was invited, after an audition, to sing at the first Post-War Bayreuth Festival in 1951. Wieland and Wolfgang Wagner thought Arnold van Mill was suited well for the roles of Titurel, Hunding and Hans Sachs. It was the beginning of a long period at the Grüne Hügel, although it was not as long as it could have been. Van Mill sang all important bass roles in Bayreuth, until a misunderstanding ended the cooperation between Wieland Wagner and Van Mill.

Other roles
Between 1950 and 1980 he was famous not only for his interpretations of roles in operas of Richard Wagner, but also of roles in the operas of Wolfgang Amadeus Mozart and Giuseppe Verdi. He also performed with success in comic operas like Zar und Zimmermann of Albert Lortzing. He worked with the great stars of the fifties and sixties like Kirsten Flagstad, Birgit Nilsson, Christa Ludwig, Herbert von Karajan, Wolfgang Windgassen, Hans Knappertsbusch and Dietrich Fischer-Dieskau.

He was a member of the Hamburger Staatsoper from 1953-1971. He received the German/Austrian honorary title of Kammersänger from this theatre for his duties.

His legacy on record consists of, among others, Die Entführung aus dem Serail (Osmin), Tristan und Isolde (König Marke), Die Walküre (Hunding) and Aïda (Ramfis). He also sang in the famous 1959 recording of the 8th Symphony of Mahler under Horenstein.

References

1921 births
1996 deaths
20th-century Dutch male opera singers
People from Schiedam